Saint-Ferdinand Aerodrome  is an aerodrome located near Saint-Ferdinand, Quebec, Canada. Approaches and departures travel over the lake.

References

Registered aerodromes in Centre-du-Québec